The Hospital of St Thomas of Acre was the medieval London headquarters of the Knights of Saint Thomas.  It was founded as a church in 1227 in the parish of St Mary Colechurch, birthplace of the order's patron saint, Saint Thomas Becket. In the 14th century and after it was the main headquarters of the military order.

In 1512, the Worshipful Company of Mercers bought from the order a site by the church on which to build their hall, and in 1514 they formally became the patron to the order.

In 1538, during the Protestant Reformation, the order was dissolved and the properties were forfeit to the crown, but were subsequently acquired by the Mercers in exchange for various payments, rents, and undertakings.

Burials
John Alleyn
Joan Butler, Countess of Ormond, in the Mercers' Chapel
Thomas Butler, 7th Earl of Ormond, in the Mercers' Chapel

Notes

The church of St. Thomas Acre at British History Online

Religious buildings and structures completed in 1227
13th-century church buildings in England
Churches in the City of London
1227 establishments in England
16th-century disestablishments in England